Rugby League Samoa are the governing body for rugby league in Samoa. They are based in the capital Apia, the League has suffered financially due to member leagues not paying affiliation fees.

History
They were founded in 1949 and have been members of the Rugby League International Federation since 1974.

Along with the governing bodies of Tonga, Samoa, Fiji and the Cook Islands, they founded the Asia-Pacific Rugby League Confederation in December 2009.

See also

References

External links

Rugby league in Samoa
Rugby league governing bodies in Oceania
Sports organizations established in 1949